"Corruption was one of the primary reasons that pushed the masses to rally in 2011". Corruption defines Egypt's economy in more ways than one. While popular businesses receive privileged treatment, the average business must embrace a culture of lying, extortion, embezzlement, and bribery. This favoritism forces businesses to have strong networks in order to survive. Although laws exist to criminalize these actions, they are poorly enforced.

Corruption in the economy
Businesses with more informal connections within the government receive preferential treatment navigating through Egypt's complex regulatory framework, providing a disincentive for competition. An inefficient and sporadically enforced legal system and a widespread culture of corruption leave businesses reliant on the use of middlemen known as "wasta", to operate, and well-connected businesses enjoy privileged treatment.

Facilitation payments are an established part of 'getting things done', despite irregular payments and gifts being criminalized. Facilitation payments are regarded as bribery in many countries, which prevents many foreign entities from financial involvement with Egypt since they are a required part of doing business. Corruption makes the costs of both local goods as well as imports higher, decreasing the purchasing power of individuals which magnifies poverty.

However, with the new 2016 Investment Law  signed in March 2016 under the Minister of investment and international cooperation Sahar Nasr (government of Sherif Ismail) under the presidency of Abdel Fattah el-Sisi, the business scene has seen more flexibility. The law aims to reduce stifling bureaucracy in order to attract more investors, which has seen long-awaited growth in investment in Egypt. With this law, Egypt is becoming the most attractive investment destination in Africa.

Corruption in the government
On Transparency International's 2022 Corruption Perceptions Index, Egypt scored 30 on a scale from 0 ("highly corrupt") to 100 ("very clean"). When ranked by score, Egypt ranked 130th among the 180 countries in the Index, where the country ranked first is perceived to have the most honest public sector.  For comparison, the best score was 90 (ranked 1), and the worst score was 12 (ranked 180).

Attempts at reform
Historically, the gap between legislation and enforcement has hampered the government's efforts to fight corruption.

Mubarak
Prior to the 2011 revolution, critics agreed that corruption in Egypt was widespread and that anti-corruption measures were perceived to be mere cosmetic changes serving Mubarak's political agenda. However, in the last year of president Mubarak's 30 years presidency, on 2010, the "National coordination committee for combatting Corruption" has been created but been amended by a Prime Minister decree (No 493) signed by PM Ibrahim Mahlab on 2014 to provide justice and equality and equal opportunities.

Al-Sisi
In terms of enforcement, more happened under the Sisi regime with one highly publicized case of a judge who was accused of corruption and arrested the moment he resigned from his position. The judge committed suicide very soon thereafter. Under the presidency of Abdel Fattah el-Sisi, many attempts to arrest public figures accused of different forms of corruption have erupted, including ones against main governorates' governors, as well as hospital directors. 
In 2014, as the first move for the president, a council of combating corruption was created and headed by the Prime Minister, during which high-profile officials get to review developments in the area of reducing corrupt practices.

See also 
 Crime in Egypt

References

External links
Egypt Corruption Profile from the Business Anti-Corruption Portal

Egypt
Crime in Egypt by type
Politics of Egypt